Stranger from Venus (also known as Immediate Disaster and The Venusian in the United States) is a 1954 independently made UK black-and-white science fiction film, produced by Burt Balaban (who also directed), Gene Martel, and Roy Rich. The film stars Patricia Neal, Helmut Dantine and Derek Bond. It is a low-budget remake of The Day the Earth Stood Still (1951), which also starred Patricia Neal.

Plot
A flying saucer is seen in the sky above the British countryside by various eyewitnesses, including an American woman driving in her car. She crashes after being blinded by the spaceship's landing lights and deafened by its loud propulsion system. A stranger walks up to the crashed car and sees that she is badly injured.

The stranger later enters a country inn very near where the accident took place. He is able to read people's thoughts, and when asked his name, he says he has no name. Dr. Meinard, a local having a drink at the inn, introduces himself and is able to examine the stranger, and discovers that he has no pulse. The stranger also asserts that he is responsible for saving the life of a recently missing car accident victim, Susan North. She later walks into the inn a little dazed, but with her crash wounds nearly healed. After the mysterious stranger announces that he comes from the planet Venus, a guest at the inn, Arthur Walker, a high-ranking British government official (and Susan's fiancé), calls the Ministry of War to inform them of the alien's arrival. The area surrounding the inn is quickly cordoned off by the government.
	 
Journalist Charles Dixon tries to learn more about the alien from Venus. Dixon discovers that the stranger is able to fluently speak multiple human languages, and that his civilisation has learned about humanity from listening to our radio broadcasts and viewing our television transmissions. He also explains how Venusians use "magnetic brilliance" to power their spaceship propulsion, supplied by the magnetic energy fields of the other planets in our solar system, as they revolve in their various orbits.

When governmental officials arrive at the inn, the stranger from Venus outlines his purpose for coming to Earth: to prepare the way for the arrival of his superiors, who have a dire warning for humanity's leaders. Humans are developing dangerous technologies without measuring their long term destructive consequences. Nuclear explosions create very dangerous magnetic field effects that threaten Venus and the other planets. Should fifty hydrogen bombs be exploded in the same general location in a future atomic war, they could alter the Earth's orbit, affecting its gravitational field and thus the orbits and gravity of all other planets in the solar system. The stranger makes a promise that if Earth eliminates these dangers, Venus will share some of its higher scientific knowledge. During the meeting, however, the alien concludes that humanity is far from ready to receive such advanced knowledge and announces this conclusion to the British officials.

After his communication disc, allowing him to contact the approaching spaceship, is removed from his room by a policeman, the alien quickly realises that an interplanetary meeting of minds can never take place. The British military soon arrives and cordons off the spaceship's landing site. They turn it into a magnetic trap in order to seize the Venusian saucer for its advanced technology.

Should the government carry out this warlike action, the stranger assures Walker that an immediate retaliation from an orbiting mothership would terminate all life in England. Walker tries to dissuade the war ministry, without success, so he acquires the stolen communication disc and returns it. The alien is able to warn away the approaching spaceship and an interplanetary conflict is avoided. Discussion with all of Earth's leaders has been derailed by the British government's short-sighted greed and treachery. The future now uncertain, and his peaceful mission to Earth a failure, the stranger from Venus speaks one final time to Susan North and vanishes without a trace.

Cast
Patricia Neal as Susan North
Helmut Dantine as The Stranger
Derek Bond as Arthur Walker
Cyril Luckham as Dr. Meinard
Willoughby Gray as Tom Harding
Marigold Russell as Gretchen Harding
Arthur Young as Scientist
Kenneth Edwards as Charles Dixon
David Garth as First Police Officer
Stanley Van Beers as General
Nigel Green as Second Police Officer
Graham Stuart as Police Chief Richards
John Le Mesurier as man on telephone (uncredited)

US theatrical and television releases
The film was released theatrically in the UK and in other countries under the titles Stranger from Venus and Immediate Disaster. In the U.S. it was only released to television by Flamingo Telefilm out of New York City under the title Immediate Disaster. This was due to a fear of legal action from 20th Century Fox, its plot being similar to Patricia Neal's earlier science fiction film The Day the Earth Stood Still, which in 1954 was still in theatrical re-release.

The film was later sold to Wade Williams Distribution, and the film was made available theatrically under the title Stranger from Venus. It has since been licensed for home video use for several decades.

Home media
Stranger from Venus was released on VHS by Englewood Entertainment. On September 5, 2000, Image Entertainment released the film on Region 1 DVD.

References

Bibliography
 Warren, Bill. Keep Watching the Skies: American Science Fiction Films of the Fifties, 21st Century Edition. Jefferson, North Carolina: McFarland & Company, 2009 (First Edition 1982). .

External links

1950s English-language films
American science fiction films
British science fiction films
1954 films
1950s science fiction films
Films directed by Burt Balaban
Films shot at MGM-British Studios
Films scored by Eric Spear
British black-and-white films
American black-and-white films
1950s American films
1950s British films